Gallia (English: Gaul), was a region of Western Europe during the Iron Age occupied by present-day France, Belgium and other neighbouring countries.

Gallia or Gallian may refer to:

Several Roman  provincia:
Gallia Cisalpina, meaning "Gaul on this side of the Alps", propraetorial province (merged with Italy ca. 42 BC). Sometimes referred to as Gallia Citerior (Hither Gaul), Provincia Ariminum, or Gallia Togata (Toga-wearing Gaul, indicating the region's early Romanization). 
Gallia Transpadana denoted that part of Cisalpine Gaul between the Padus (now Po) and the Alps
Gallia Cispadana denoted that part of Cisalpine Gaul to the south of the river Padus (Po).
Gallia Narbonensis, also known as  Transalpina (Transalpine France), meaning "Gaul on the other side of the Alps".
Gallia Comata (divided in 22 BC)
Gauls, the pre-Roman inhabitants of Gaul
Gaulish language
Gallia, Ohio, an unincorporated community
Gallia County, Ohio, a county in southern Ohio in the United States
148 Gallia, an asteroid
SS Gallia, a transatlantic ocean liner sunk during World War I by the German submarine U-35
 Gallia gens, an ancient Roman family
Gallia (goddess), a Gaulish goddess mentioned in an inscription found at the site of Vindolanda
Gallia (novel), an 1895 novel by Ménie Muriel Dowie
Gallia, a fictional comet, setting for most of Jules Verne's Off on a Comet
Gallia, a country in Nintendo's video games Fire Emblem: Path of Radiance and Fire Emblem: Radiant Dawn.
Gallia, the main setting for the Valkyria Chronicles, video game series produced by Sega.
Gallians, alumni of Lawrence College, Murree
Gallia, another term for the chemical compound gallium(III) oxide,